Wang Shouting (born on September 3, 1985) is a Chinese professional football player. He plays midfielder for Chinese club Dalian Duxing.

Club career
Wang Shouting was a promising youngster when he played for the Liaoning's youth teams and was good enough to be called up to the Chinese Under-20 football team. He attracted the interests of Shanghai United and would start his professional football career when he joined during the 2005 Chinese Super League season. He made his league debut on July 3, 2005 in a 1-1 draw against Liaoning Zhongyu and then continue to establish himself within the squad. This caught the attention of Dalian Shide and he transferred to them at the beginning of the 2006 Chinese Super League season, however his time with them was short when he was unable to break into the first team squad. 

Still a relatively young player with top tier experience saw newly promoted Henan Construction willing to take Wang Shouting and revive his career with them. He would immediately become a regular when he started in their second game of the season against Beijing Guoan on March 11, 2007 in a 0-0 draw.

On 28 February 2018, Wang was loaned to China League One side Shanghai Shenxin for one season. In July 2018, his loan spell was cut short and was loaned to first-tier club Changchun Yatai instead for the rest of the season. Shanghai Shenhua announced Wang's departure on 14 February 2019 when his contract expired.

On 28 February 2019, Wang signed a contract with newly-relegated China League One side Guizhou Hengfeng.

Career statistics

Statistics accurate as of match played 31 December 2020

Honours

Club
Shanghai Shenhua
Chinese FA Cup: 2017

References

External links
 
Player stats at sohu.com
Player info at sina.com

1985 births
Living people
Chinese footballers
Footballers from Dalian
Dalian Shide F.C. players
Henan Songshan Longmen F.C. players
Liaoning F.C. players
Shanghai Shenhua F.C. players
Shanghai Shenxin F.C. players
Changchun Yatai F.C. players
Guizhou F.C. players
Chinese Super League players
China League One players
Association football midfielders